Fairview, Maryland may refer to the following places in the U.S. state of Maryland:
Fairview, Anne Arundel County, Maryland
Fairview, Frederick County, Maryland
Fairview, Garrett County, Maryland
Fairview, Harford County, Maryland
Fairview, Montgomery County, Maryland
Fairview, Washington County, Maryland